Hall Tour 2014: Bon Voyage (stylized as Hall Tour 2014 ~Bon Voyage~), is Koda Kumi's 13th concert video and coincides with her album Bon Voyage. It reached No. 3 on the Oricon DVD charts and stayed on the charts for 8 weeks. It was her first tour since Secret First Class Limited Live to not carry the prelude of "Live Tour," this time carrying "Hall Tour."

Information
Hall Tour 2014 ~Bon Voyage~ is the thirteenth concert video by Japanese singer-songwriter Koda Kumi, and corresponded to her 2014 studio album Bon Voyage. Keeping in line with her previous concert video releases, the DVD debuted at No. 1 on the Oricon DVD/Blu-ray Charts; however, it dropped in ranking to take No. 3 for the week, remaining on the charts for eight consecutive weeks. It became her first concert tour to not carry the title "live tour" in the title since her 2005 concert Secret First Class Limited Live.

The tour was released in two editions, 2DVD and Blu-ray. The second DVD featured the live of the song "Money In My Bag" performed at the Kobe Kokusai Hall in Chūō-ku on August 2, 2014, the background video footage used for the performance of "Crank Tha Bass" and a behind-the-scenes document reel of the tour. All three tracks were available on the single disc of the Blu-ray.

While most of the track listing for the concert consisted of songs from Bon Voyage, several songs from other albums also made an appearance, including "Rock Your Body" from Feel My Mind, "Koi no Tsubomi" from Black Cherry and "Butterfly" from Best ~first things~. She also performed the then-unreleased song "Bring It On", which she would later release on her 2017 album W Face ~inside~.

Track list
(Official Track List)

DVD1
 "Let's show tonight"
 "Winner Girls"
 "Show Me Your Holla"
 "Rock Your Body"
 "Everyday"
 "Butterfly"(Interlude movie 1)
 "Yume no Uta"
 "Koishikute"
 "Imagine"~Band Introduce~
 "Koi no Tsubomi"
 "Special Medley"~real Emotion / Last Angel / Go to the top / Crazy 4 U / Gentle Words / Anata Dake ga / Take Back / TABOO / Lady Go!~(Interlude movie 2)
 "Crank Tha Bass"~Dance Part~
 "Touch Down"
 "LOL"
 "XXX"
 "Is This Trap?"
 "Dreaming Now!"
 "LOADED feat. Sean Paul"(Interlude movie 3)~Encore~
 "U KNOW"
 "LALALALALA"
 "Bring It On"
 "walk"

DVD2
 "Money In My Bag LIVE MOVIE" (New Song Performed in 2014.08.02 @Kobe Kokusai Kaikan)
 "Crank Tha Bass" LIVE BACKGROUND MOVIE
 "Koda Kumi Hall Tour 2014 ~Bon Voyage~ document real"

Show dates

Charts (Japan)
Oricon Sales Chart (Japan)

References

2014 video albums
Koda Kumi video albums
Live video albums
Koda Kumi live albums